"Turn Me Loose" is a hit song recorded by the Canadian rock band Loverboy. It was released on their eponymous debut album in 1980, and as a single in 1981. With a strong rock synthesizer start to the song, followed by a steady build on the guitars, it peaked at #7 on the RPM singles chart in 1981 and #6 on the Billboard Top Tracks chart in the US.

Record World attributed the song's success to "Mike Reno's vocal plea, a guitar grind, and marvelous production."

Charts

Year-end charts
{| class="wikitable sortable plainrowheaders" style="text-align:center"
|+Year-end chart performance for '! Chart (1981)
! Position
|-
! scope="row"| Australia (Kent Music Report)
| 12
|}

Personnel
 Mike Reno – lead vocals
 Paul Dean – guitar, backing vocals
 Doug Johnson – keyboards
 Scott Smith – bass
 Matt Frenette – drumsAdditional musician' Nancy Nash – backing vocals

Cover versions
Eminem and Limp Bizkit collaborated to "cover" the song, albeit with significantly altered lyrics, around 1999.
Tim Rogers and Tex Perkins covered it on their 2006 album My Better Half, under their recording alias T'N'T
Electric Six covered the song on their cover album Mimicry and Memories (2015).

 Young Divas version 

"Turn Me Loose" was covered by Australian girl group Young Divas for their second studio album New Attitude''. It was released physically and digitally as the lead single from the album on November 17, 2007. "Turn Me Loose" also features New Zealand rapper Savage and is the final single released by the Young Divas. The song peaked at number 15 on the ARIA Singles Chart. The music video for "Turn Me Loose" features the Young Divas singing and dancing in front of a white backdrop.

Track listing
CD single
"Turn Me Loose" – 3:50
"Dear Santa (Bring Me a Man This Christmas)" – 3:40

Digital EP
"Turn Me Loose" – 3:50
"Dear Santa (Bring Me a Man This Christmas)" – 3:40
"Turn Me Loose" (Divas Only Version) – 3:18

Weekly chart

Year-end chart

References

2007 singles
Loverboy songs
Young Divas songs
Song recordings produced by Bruce Fairbairn
Songs written by Paul Dean (guitarist)
Songs written by Mike Reno
1980 songs
Columbia Records singles
Sony Music Australia singles
Sony BMG singles
1981 debut singles
Juno Award for Single of the Year singles